Orchard Hill  may refer to:

Towns
 Orchard Hill, Georgia
 Orchard Hill, Maryland

Neighborhoods
Orchard Hill, a residential area of Northam, Devon, England
 Orchard Hill (Omaha)

See also
Orchard Hills (disambiguation)